Mauchline was one of 32 electoral wards of East Ayrshire Council. Originally created in 1974, the ward was initially within Cumnock and Doon Valley District Council before the local government reforms in the 1990s. The ward elected one councillor using the first-past-the-post voting electoral system.

The ward was a Labour stronghold as the party successfully held the seat at every election after gaining it from the Conservatives in 1977 until it was abolished.

In 2007, the ward was abolished and replaced by the multi-member Ballochmyle ward as council elections moved to a proportional voting system – the single transferable vote – following the implementation of the Local Governance (Scotland) Act 2004.

Boundaries
The Mauchline ward was created in 1974 by the Formation Electoral Arrangements from the previous Mauchline electoral division of Ayr County Council. The ward centered around the town of Mauchline and took in the northwestern part of Cumnock and Doon Valley between its borders with Kilmarnock and Loudoun District Council and Kyle and Carrick District Council. The boundaries remained largely unchanged following the Initial Statutory Reviews of Electoral Arrangements in 1981 and the Second Statutory Reviews of Electoral Arrangements in 1994. After the implementation of the Local Government etc. (Scotland) Act 1994, the boundaries proposed by the second review became the Formation Electoral Arrangements for the newly created East Ayrshire Council – an amalgamation of Cumnock and Doon Valley District Council and Kilmarnock and Loudoun District Council. In 1998, the Third Statutory Reviews of Electoral Arrangements reduced the area the ward covered as the eastern part of the town between Sorn Road and Welton Road alongside the area covered by Ballochmyle Golf Course was moved to the newly created Catrine, Sorn and Mauchline East ward ahead of the 1999 election. In 2007, the ward was abolished as the Local Governance (Scotland) Act 2004 saw proportional representation and new multi-member wards introduced. The majority of the area covered by the Mauchline ward was placed into the new Ballochmyle ward and an area south of the town was placed in the Cumnock and New Cumnock ward.

Councillors

Election results

2003 election

1999 election

1995 election

1992 election

1988 election

1984 election

1980 election

1977 election

1974 election

References

Wards of East Ayrshire
Mauchline